The 1956–57 Toronto Maple Leafs season was Toronto's 40th season in the National Hockey League (NHL).

Offseason

Regular season

Final standings

Record vs. opponents

Schedule and results

Playoffs

Player statistics

Regular season
Scoring

Goaltending

Awards and records

Transactions

See also
 1956–57 NHL season

References

External links

Toronto Maple Leafs season, 1956-57
Toronto Maple Leafs seasons
Tor